The 1934–35 season in Swedish football, starting August 1934 and ending July 1935:

Honours

Official titles

Competitions

Promotions, relegations and qualifications

Promotions

League transfers

Relegations

Domestic results

Allsvenskan 1934–35

Allsvenskan promotion play-off 1934–35

Division 2 Norra 1934–35

Division 2 Östra 1934–35

Division 2 Västra 1934–35

Division 2 Södra 1934–35

Division 2 promotion play-off 1934–35

National team results 

 Sweden: 

 Sweden: 

 Sweden: 

 Sweden: 

 Sweden: 

 Sweden: 

 Sweden:

National team players in season 1934–35

Notes

References 
Print

Online

 
Seasons in Swedish football